Biltmore Village Cottages are two historic homes formerly located at Biltmore Village, Asheville, Buncombe County, North Carolina.  They were designed by Richard Sharp Smith and built about 1900.  The dwellings are pebbledash finished half-timbered cottages. They were moved outside the district in August 1983.

It was listed on the National Register of Historic Places in 1979.

References

Houses on the National Register of Historic Places in North Carolina
Houses completed in 1900
Houses in Asheville, North Carolina
National Register of Historic Places in Buncombe County, North Carolina
Vanderbilt family residences